Sudhir Hazareesingh  (18 October 1961) is a British-Mauritian historian. He has been a fellow and Tutor in Politics at Balliol College, Oxford since 1990. Most of his work relates to modern political history from 1850; including the history of contemporary France as well as Napoleon, the Republic and Charles de Gaulle.

Biography
Hazareesingh is the son of Kissoonsing Hazareesingh, a Cambridge- and Sorbonne-educated historian in his own right, who was a notable figure in Mauritian public life as a Mauritius Times writer and Principal Private Secretary to Seewoosagur Ramgoolam.

Hazareesingh's Toussaint Louverture biography Black Spartacus: The Epic Life of Toussaint Louverture was published by Farrar, Straus and Giroux in September 2020. It was shortlisted for the 2020 Baillie Gifford Prize. Described in The Guardian as "a tour de force: by far the most complete, authoritative and persuasive biography of Toussaint that we are likely to have for a long time", Black Spartacus was BBC Radio 4's "Book of the Week" from 16 November 2020, read by Adrian Lester. It won the 2021 Wolfson History Prize and was shortlisted for the James Tait Black Prize for biography.

He is a member of the international reading committee of the Institut Napoléon, a French learned society founded in 1932, dedicated to Napoleonic studies.

He is on the editorial boards of the international journal Napoleonica La Revue, "an online review which aims to promote research in the history of the First and Second French Empires". Napoleonica La Revue is "published by the Fondation Napoléon, is academic, multidisciplinary, international and peer-reviewed".

Publications 

 Black Spartacus: The Epic Life of Toussaint Louverture. Allen Lane, 2019.
 How the French Think. Allen Lane, 2015
In the Shadow of the General: Modern France and the Myth of De Gaulle. New York, Oxford University Press, 2012 (this is an English version of Le Mythe Gaullien, first published in French by Gallimard in 2010)
 Les préfets de Gambetta (with Vincent Wright and Eric Anceau), Paris, Presses de l'Université Paris-Sorbonne, 2007
 The Saint-Napoleon. Celebrations of Sovereignty in 19th Century France, Cambridge, Mass., Harvard University Press 2004 (French translation published by Editions Tallandier, 2007)
 The Legend of Napoleon, London, Granta, 2004 (French translation, Editions Tallandier, 2005; published in collection Points-Seuil, 2008)
 The Jacobin Legacy in Modern France. Essays in Honour of Vincent Wright (editor and contributor), Oxford, Oxford University Press, 2002
 Francs-Maçons sous le Second Empire (with Vincent Wright), Rennes, Presses Universitaires de Rennes, 2001
 Intellectual Founders of the Republic: Five Studies in 19th Century French Political Thought, Oxford, Oxford University Press, 2001 (revised paperback edition, 2005)

Awards and decorations

:
 Grand Commander of the Order of the Star and Key of the Indian Ocean (2020)

References/Notes and references

Historians of the Napoleonic Wars
1961 births
Living people
Political historians
Political science writers
British historians
British foreign policy writers
British people of Mauritian descent
Grand Commanders of the Order of the Star and Key of the Indian Ocean
British people of Indian descent
Alumni of Nuffield College, Oxford
Alumni of Balliol College, Oxford